Vidya Jyothi V. K. Samaranayake, MBCS, MCS(SL), FNASSL, MIEEE (Sinhala:වී.කේ.සමරනායක) (1939 – 6 June 2007) pioneered computing & IT development industry and usage in Sri Lanka and thus considered as the "Father of Information Technology" in Sri Lanka. He was a Professor of Computer Science and former Dean of the Faculty of Science, University of Colombo. Prof Samaranayake played a major role in the development of IT and IT related education in Sri Lanka. He was at the time of his death the chairman of the Information and Communication Technology Agency (ICTA) of Sri Lanka and was the founding and former director of the University of Colombo School of Computing (UCSC).

Early life and education
Samaranayake was born to Mr. and Mrs. V. W. Samaranayake on 22 May 1939. He started his primary schooling at Ananda College and completed his secondary education with distinction at the Royal College Colombo and went on to do his higher studies at the University of Ceylon. He graduated with a BSc in Special Mathematics (First Class Honors) in 1961 and then proceeded to England for his post-graduate studies on a Ceylon Government Scholarship for Mathematics. He received a Diploma of Imperial College from Imperial College and a PhD from King's College London, both in the field of Mathematical Physics.

Family
Samaranayake was married to Sriya Samaranayake, who was the former Deputy Commissioner, Inland Revenue Department. His brother was V. A. Samaranayake Professor at the University of Missouri–Rolla. He was the father of Nayana Samaranayake who founded sl2college.

Death
Samaranayake died in Stockholm, Sweden on 6 June 2007. The Sri Lankan Government awarded Samaranayake a funeral with state patronage at the Independence Square, Colombo on 13 June 2007, as an appreciation of the contributions and accomplishments Prof Samaranayake.

Career
After completing his education Samaranayake went on to serve the University of Ceylon (in 1974 University of Ceylon was abolished and University of Colombo created from the Colombo campus of the former university) for the next 43 years since 1961. He was appointed Professor of Mathematics and Head, Department of Mathematics in 1974 and Dean of the Faculty of Science in 1975.

Samaranayake was the founder of the Department of Statistics and Computer Science (DSCS) in 1985 and of the Institute of Computer Technology (ICT) of the University of Colombo in 1987. These two institutions were merged as the University of Colombo School of Computing in 2002.

Samaranayake served the Council for Information Technology (CINTEC), the apex National agency for IT in Sri Lanka as its chairman for a period of 12 years. In the field of IT he has pioneered work on IT Policy, Legal Infrastructure, EDI/E-Commerce, Security, Internet Technology, Computer Awareness and IT Education. In 2004 Prof. Samaranayake became the chairman of the Information and Communication Technology Agency (ICTA) the government agency governing the ICT in Sri Lanka, he held the post till his death in 2007. He was the President of the Sri Lanka Association for the Advancement of Science during its golden jubilee in 1994. At the time of his death he was the president of Infotel Lanka Society.

Fellowships

Samaranayake was associated with the International Centre for Theoretical Physics (ICTP) in Trieste, Italy since 1969 as a UNESCO Fellow in Mathematical Physics (1969), IAEA Fellow in Mathematical Physics (1971), Associate Member (1972–1977) and a Senior Member since 1978.

He was a Fellow of the Harvard Information Infrastructure Project in 2001 and Research Fellow of the National Centre for Digital Government in 2003, both at Harvard Kennedy School at Harvard University.

He was a Fellow of the Reuters Digital Vision Program at Stanford University in 2005.

Awards

The Government of Sri Lanka has honoured Samaranayake for his contribution to IT in the country by awarding of the award of Vidya Prasadini in 1997 and the national honour Vidya Jyothi in 1998.
The Japan International Cooperation Agency (JICA) has presented its President's Award for International Cooperation to Prof. Samaranayake in 1996 in recognition of his contribution.
The University of Colombo at its convocation held in January 2005, conferred on Prof. Samaranayake the Degree of Doctor of Science (Honoris Causa) for his outstanding contribution to the University of Colombo.

Major contributions
Samaranayake was actively involved in the formulation of the WASO 10646 standard for Sinhalese Characters and in the development of multilingual web sites and has been instrumental in helping to apply computers in many areas of governance, including in national elections. In 1999 he chaired the National Y2K Task force that coordinated the very successful crossover to year 2000. More recently he initiated the External Degree of Bachelor of Information Technology (BIT) of the University of Colombo, which in its very first year of operation has attracted 5000 registrations. He was the Chairman of the Project Management Committee of the SIDA funded project to enhance the internet connectivity of Sri Lankan Universities. At the time of his death he was involved in introducing ICT to rural communities and was engaged in developing Multipurpose Community Tele-Centers. He was a member of the advisory panel of the Asia IT&C program of the European Commission.

Books published
Mulika Tharaka Vidyava, M.D. Gunasena & Co. Ltd. (1965) (A book on elementary Astronomy in Sinhala) *Tharaka – A reprint of the section on Stars of "Mulika Tharaka Vidyava"  (1999)

Research Publications
 A New Determination of the Pion-Nucleon Coupling Constant and S-Wave Scattering Lengths (with W.S. Woolcock) Phy. Rev. Lett. 15 (1965) 936 – 938.
 Determination of the Pion-Nucleon Coupling Constant and s- Wave Scattering Lengths (with W.S. Woolcock) Proceedings of the Lund Conference on Elementary Particles (1969).
 Determination of the Pion-Nucleo n P-Wave and d-Wave Scattering Lengths (with B.P. Collins and W.S. Woolcock) Proceedings of the Lund Conference on Elementary Particles (1969).
 Spin and D-State Effects on High Energy Elastic Scattering of Pions on 3He (with H. Baier) Nucl. Phys. B15 (1970).
 Elastic Scattering of Low Energy Pions by Alpha Particles (with Harun-ar-Rashid) Nucl. Phys. B17 (1970).
 High Energy Scattering of Hadrons on 6Li (with Il-Tong Cheon) Nucl. Phys. A154 (1970) 93 – 96.
 Elastic Scattering of Pions on 4He at Small Momentum Transfer (with H. Baier) Nucl. Phy. B24 (1970) 273 – 284.
 S' and D' State Effects in 3He Form Factors and in p-3He Elastic Scattering Cross Sections (with G. Wilk) Lett. al Nuovo Cimento 4 (1972) 27 – 32.
 Determination of the Pion-Nucleon Coupling Constant and S- Wave Scattering Lengths (with W.S. Woolcock) Nucl. Phys. B48 (1972) 205 – 224.
 Forward Dispersion Relation Constraints on the Pion-Nucleon P-Wave and D-Wave Scattering Lengths (with W.S. Woolcock) Nucl. Phys. B49 (1972) 128 – 140.
 High Energy Nuclear Scattering and Rising Cross Sections Lett. Nuovo Cim 9 (1974) 677.

See also
Information Technology in Sri Lanka

References

Further reading

External links
Prof. V K Samaranayaka Foundation
Prof. V K Samaranayake Web Portal
Vidya Jyothi Professor V.K.Samaranayake bio
E-Sri Lanka: Prof. V.K. Samaranayake’s lasting legacy
Let us carry on the work of this great visionary

1939 births
2007 deaths
Sri Lankan computer scientists
Alumni of the University of Ceylon (Colombo)
Alumni of Imperial College London
Harvard Kennedy School staff
Alumni of Ananda College
Alumni of Royal College, Colombo
Members of the British Computer Society
Senior Members of the IEEE
Alumni of King's College London
Academic staff of the University of Colombo
Sinhalese academics
Vidya Jyothi